Terry Walsh may refer to:
Terry Walsh (actor),  British actor and stuntman
Terry Walsh (field hockey), Australian field hockey coach and player
Terry Walsh (footballer), Australian rules footballer
Terry Walsh (Love Island)